Mhlume is a town located in the Lubombo district of Eswatini.

Mhlume has a population in excess of 20,000. It is well known for its large sugar cane fields in the area. It also has a sugar refinery called Mhlume (Swaziland) Sugar Company.
Mhlume Sugar Company acquires sugar cane from out-growers in the surrounding area during the harvesting season. The Mill is managed on behalf of the Swazi Nation in part by personnel and management of the Commonwealth Development Corporation based in London.

Populated places in Lubombo Region